The Emergency Daylight Saving Time Energy Conservation Act is a law that made Daylight Saving Time effective year-round for a two-year trial period 
. This trial period was intended to begin on January 6, 1974, and ended on April 7, 1975, but lawmakers ended the experiment early on October 27, 1974, and did not make the change permanent due to concerns about darkness on winter mornings.

External links
 Full text and legislative history of the Act

References

Daylight saving time in the United States